The 1976 William & Mary Indians football team represented the College of William & Mary as a member of the Southern Conference (SoCon) during the 1976 NCAA Division I football season. Led by Jim Root in his fifth year as head coach, William & Mary finished the season 7–4 overall and 3–2 in SoCon play to place second.

Schedule

References

William and Mary
William & Mary Tribe football seasons
William and Mary Indians football